The Woman of My Dreams (also known as The Woman of My Life) is a 2010 Italian comedy-drama film directed by Luca Lucini and starring Alessandro Gassman, Luca Argentero, Stefania Sandrelli, and Valentina Lodovini.

Plot 

Leonardo and Giorgio are two brothers with very different characters. Leonardo is sensitive and reliable, while Giorgio is an unstable womanizer. After a suicide attempt, Leonardo meets Sara, not knowing that she is Giorgio's ex, and in time they fall in love.

With difficulty, and only after the involvement of Giorgio's mother Alba, they restore their friendship.

Cast  
 
 Alessandro Gassman as  Giorgio
 Luca Argentero as  Leonardo
 Valentina Lodovini as  Sara
 Stefania Sandrelli as  Alba
 Giorgio Colangeli as  Sandro
 Sonia Bergamasco as  Carolina
 Gaia Bermani Amaral as Irene
  as  Alba's friend
  Franco Branciaroli as Alberto 
 Francesca Chillemi as herself

See also    
 List of Italian films of 2010

References

External links

Italian comedy-drama films
2010 comedy-drama films
2010 films
Films directed by Luca Lucini
2010s Italian films